Hashomer may refer to:

The Hebrew word for guard
Hashomer, an Israeli defense organization
Hashomer Hatzair, a youth movement